The national rugby union team of the former East Germany played its first rugby international in 1951 against Romania.  It never played in a Rugby World Cup, not being invited to the inaugural 1987 edition, the only one held while East Germany was in existence. The team played its last match in 1990, before merging with the West German rugby union team to form a single team representing all of Germany. In its 40-year history, the East German team never played its West German counterpart in a rugby test match.

This is a list of games played by the East German team against other nations.

Internationals
This list is most likely incomplete.

Overview

1950s

1960s

1970s

1980s

1990s

 East German wins in bold.
 Locations of East German home games in bold.

Record of international matches

See also
 List of Germany national rugby union team results

Sources
 East Germany international rugby results at rugbyinternational.net
 East Germany results at the IRB website

External links
 Deutscher Rugby-Verband - Official Site
 Totalrugby.de German rugby website with news and results
 Germany at RugbyData.com Statistics and results

References

German Democratic Republic
Rugby union in East Germany